Nezahualcoyotl may refer to:

 Nezahualcoyotl (tlatoani), the ruler of Texcoco
 Ciudad Nezahualcóyotl, a city in the State of Mexico
 Nezahualcóyotl metro station, in Mexico City
 The Nezahualcóyotl Award, a literary prize in Mexico
 Nezahualcóyotl (Mexibús), a BRT station in Nezahualcóyotl, Mexico
 Malpaso Dam, officially the Nezahualcóyotl Dam